Brick Lane is a 2007 British drama film directed by Sarah Gavron, at her directorial debut and adapted from the 2003 novel of the same name by the British writer Monica Ali. The screenplay was written by Laura Jones and Abi Morgan.

The Indian actress Tannishtha Chatterjee played the lead role of Nazneen. The film had its first public screening at the Telluride Film Festival in the United States.

Plot
The movie largely takes place in London following the September 11 attacks on the United States by al-Qaeda, and reflects a period of heightened racial tensions in Britain as well.

The film tells the story of Nazneen, who has grown up in rural Bangladesh, in the district of Mymensingh. Nazneen has a sister, but when she is still young, her mother drowns herself because she can not handle the hardship of life in the village. Their father marries Nazneen, elder of the two girls, to a middle-aged but educated man, Chanu, who lives in London. Nazneen leaves behind her sister and her family home in Bangladesh when Chanu takes her back to the United Kingdom. They live in a small flat on Brick Lane, the centre of the British Bengali community, and Nazneen herself has two daughters. Married to a man she does not love, Nazneen lives vicariously through the letters she receives from her sister about her carefree life and love affairs.

The film picks up the story after Nazneen and her husband have lived in the small flat for 17 years, raising two daughters. It is not pleasant.  Her first child, a son, died as a baby in his cot. Brick Lane is harassed by bigoted people handing out flyers that fan irrational fears of Muslim extremists taking over the streets of London. The flat is small and cramped. Her only resources are for groceries to feed her now teenaged daughters and her husband. She misses her sister and yearns to get back home.

Nazneen does not love her husband but is submissive to him for the sake of peace and her two children. Her husband resigns from his job for what he sees as unappreciation for his skills and talents. Nazneen gets a sewing machine from a neighbor to earn money mending jeans for a pound a piece.

She then meets Karim, who delivers clothes to her for work. The Bangladeshi Muslim community in London is increasingly religious in nature, and this is reflected in the character of Karim. Nazneen becomes filled with desire for the young, good-looking Karim who visits her regularly, and they have an affair.

In the meantime, her husband borrows money from a loan shark who has a reputation for always coming back for more money. Nazneen attends a Muslim "Unite" program during which they decide to call themselves the Bengal Tigers. Later, more sparks fly between her and Karim and he takes her to his uncle's factory and they kiss.

Finally Nazneen makes the connection that her sister is prostituting herself to get money; that is why she describes all these illicit affairs. Nazneen has an emotional breakdown during this time and she is put in bed to sleep. Chanu begins to pack up as Nazneen recovers. He also gets tickets for their trip back to Bangladesh. Meanwhile Karim goes away to see his family in another town; he then comes back to visit her, and tells her he turned down marriage with another girl for Nazneen. Their conversation is interrupted by Nazneen's elder daughter. Her daughter questions Nazneen's relationship with Karim.

A woman representing the loan sharks harasses Nazneen for more money that is supposedly owed. Her daughters voice their displeasure about leaving to Bangladesh. She confronts her husband about the debt he owes the loan sharks which he brushes off. Chanu and Nazneen attend a Muslim rally in a town hall and Chanu berates the cause of the gathering but they rebuff his statements.

Nazneen informs Karim that she does not want to marry him because she is "no longer the girl from the village." Karim leaves broken-hearted and in tears. Nazneen tells the loan shark off, saying she has overpaid the debt her husband owes, and the lady leaves after she refuses to swear on the Quran that they owe more. Their eldest daughter confronts both Chanu and Nazneen about her own desire to stay in London. She then runs off into the streets while a festival is ongoing as her mother runs after her. Nazneen catches up to her at the train station. Chanu and Nazneen share a heart to heart about staying and leaving. Despite always longing for her 'home', Nazneen realizes her home is where her children are happy. Chanu decides that he will leave and that they will follow him at a later date.

Casting and production
Tannishtha Chatterjee was the first actress who auditioned for the role of Nazneen. Two months after her initial audition, after Gavron had seen several hundred women, Gavron hired her. Both Christopher Simpson, who played Karim, and Chatterjee studied the Bangladeshi culture in Brick Lane by following around locals. Satish Kaushik was cast after Gavron saw a picture of him on the Internet. Since Brick Lane was his first English-language film, he took lessons from a diction coach to improve his accent.

Many residents of Brick Lane were hired as extras to appear on the film, and some members of crew were hired from the local area. The film's winter scenes were shot in the middle of a heat wave in Summer 2006, which required the production team to use artificial snow. Portions of the film were shot in West Bengal.

Ruby Films was the production company. Sarah Gavron intended to film some scenes in Brick Lane. Because of opposition from some of the local community, police advised her to change locations after demonstrations were threatened.

The novel and film provoked criticism by some in the Bangladeshi community in London, who thought that Chanu, and the Bangladeshis from Sylhet generally, were portrayed in a negative way. Some traders organized against having the film company doing any production in the neighbourhood; on 31 July 2006, about 120 British Bangladeshis held a protest in Brick Lane. Others wrote letters to the editor in The Guardian and spoke in support of the film production, including the British chapter of PEN and the writer Salman Rushdie.

Cast
 Tannishtha Chatterjee as Nazneen Ahmed
 Satish Kaushik as Chanu Ahmed
 Christopher Simpson as Karim
 Naeema Begum as Rukshana 'Shahna' Ahmed
 Lana Rahman as Bibi Ahmed
 Lalita Ahmed as Mrs. Islam
 Harvey Virdi as Razia
 Zafreen as Hasina
 Harsh Nayyar as Dr. Azad
 Abdul Nlephaz Ali as Tariq
 Bijal Chandaria as Shefali

Critical reception
Brick Lane was well received by most critics. On review aggregator Rotten Tomatoes, the film has a rating of 63% based on 98 reviews with a weighted average score of 6.2/10. The site's consensus states: "Frustratingly slow-moving, but ultimately saved by Chatterjee's solid acting and Gavron's gentle patience." On Metacritic, the film has a normalized score of 61% based on 25 critics, indicating "generally favorable reviews". Roger Ebert praised the film's characters for their "depth and reality." Several critics, including Robert Koehler of Variety, compared it unfavourably with the novel.  The film was also praised in France.

As a result of the earlier controversy and a threatened protest, a planned screening for Prince Charles and the Duchess of Cornwall was cancelled.

Soundtrack

 "Adam's Lullaby" - (Natacha Atlas) - 3:05
 "Memories of a Summer" - 4:02
 "Poem" - 1:56
 "Running Through the Night" - 3:10
 "Song of the Boatman" - 3:47
 "A World Changed" - 2:34
 "Quiet Joy" - 3:03
 "Picnic at the Palace" - 1:55
 "Tapur Tapur" - 2:45
 "Love Blossoms" - 2:44
 "Rite of Passage" - 2:02
 "Departure" - 1:46
 "Leelabali" - 2:38
 "Childhood Fragments" - 1:48
 "Dreaiming" - 6:04
 "Playing in the Paddy Fields" - 2:57
 "The First Kiss" - 1:47
 "Dol Dol Duluni" - Traditional (Tannishtha Chatterjee) - 1:51

Awards
Sarah Gavron was nominated for a BAFTA award. Both Tannishtha Chatterjee and Sarah Gavron were nominated for BIFA awards, for the best actress and best director in 2007, respectively. The film won a Silver Hitchcock and best screenplay at the Dinard Festival of British Cinema.

DVD release
The film was released in the UK on 16 November 2007, and in the US by Sony Pictures Classics in a limited release on 20 June 2008. The DVD Region 2 release occurred on 10 March 2008 and the Region 1 DVD of the film was released on 13 January 2009.

See also
 List of cultural references to the September 11 attacks

References

External links
 
  
 
 
  (rating 3.5/5)
 "Interview with Sarah Gavron about Brick Lane", IFC
 About Brick Lane

2007 films
2007 directorial debut films
2007 drama films
British drama films
British Bangladeshi films
Films about immigration
Films based on British novels
Films based on the September 11 attacks
Films produced by Alison Owen
Films scored by Jocelyn Pook
Films set in London
Films shot in London
Sony Pictures Classics films
2000s British films